Koskinou is a village on the Greek island of Rhodes.
It is located 5 miles from Rhodes town and 6 miles from the island resort of Faliraki and the Music School of Rhodes.

Koskinou is famous for its unique traditional houses decorated with bright, vibrant colours. There is a major festival on July 17 when the village celebrates the name day of St. Marina with customary music and dancing. The village is part of the Kallithea-Rhodes Municipality.
The local football team called Diyenis Koskinou reside in the fourth division of the Greek league.

External links
 Discover Rhodes

Populated places in Rhodes